Trevor Paul Moore (April 4, 1980 – August 7, 2021) was an American comedian, actor, writer, director, and producer. He was known for being one of the founding members—alongside Sam Brown and Zach Cregger—of the New York City-based comedy troupe the Whitest Kids U' Know (WKUK), who had their own sketch comedy series on IFC that ran for five seasons.

Early life
Moore was born in Montclair, New Jersey. His parents are former Christian folk-rock singers Mickey and Becki Moore who were successful in the 1980s, their single "Love Song for Number Two" having reached No. 2 on the U.S. Christian charts. Because he traveled a lot on tour with his family, he changed schools constantly, going to about five different schools. By the age of 15, he became a published cartoonist after compiling his early work in a book called Scraps. At 16, Moore created the comic strip Cuddy for the now-defunct newspaper The Charlottesville Observer in Charlottesville, Virginia.

Moore attended high school at the Covenant School in Charlottesville, and by the time he was 18 he graduated while also developing personal projects. Moore started out as a broadcasting major at Virginia Commonwealth University, and while he originally wanted to study journalism and political science, he chose film in the end. Moore, like his future Whitest Kids U' Know companions Sam Brown and Zach Cregger, studied at the School of Visual Arts in Manhattan, where he majored in film with a BFA and graduated cum laude.

Career

1990s
From 1997 to 1998, his show The Trevor Moore Show ran on public-access television in Charlottesville, Virginia. It garnered a following among the local college community, and by the time he was 18, Moore was offered a deal by Pax-TV (now Ion Television). The show lasted sixteen episodes, featuring sketches like "Hey Hey, Who Died Today?" (a parody newscast from the local senior citizens' home) and the "Walking-Talking Box", but was cancelled due to what was deemed offensive material and a mistake regarding the programming of the show, namely being broadcast too early for its rating. It was his belief that the show would only air at night, but halfway through the first season he found out that it was being rerun at 9 a.m. on Saturday mornings.

Later, Moore went on to work at the cable TV startup company ImaginAsianTV as a producer and writer for Jimbo Matison's Uncle Morty's Dub Shack, a comedy show that involved comedians performing sketches and re-voicing and parodying old Asian movies.

2000s
By 2002, in his last year of college, Moore was granted a personal internship to Saturday Night Live. Initially, Moore was only going to be there for one semester, but the show ended up asking him to stay for the entire year. This got him into the coveted NBC Page Program, which receives about 50,000 applications and only admits 50 people a year. He credits Saturday Night Live creator and executive producer Lorne Michaels as part of his comedic education.

In 2004, Moore's comedy troupe, the Whitest Kids U' Know, started a regular engagement at the Lower East Side bar, Pianos. The success of WKUK on the internet and in live shows led to an invitation to the 2006 HBO U.S. Comedy Arts Festival in Aspen. The troupe won the award for Best Sketch Group and attracted the attention of many Hollywood executives. Following their success at the festival, Sundance, MTV, and Comedy Central all approached the group to do a television pilot, but Fuse was already getting it started. It is now in syndication around the world.

In 2008, Moore was a guest voice on an episode of the HBO show The Life and Times of Tim.

After the success of the Whitest Kids U' Know, Fox Searchlight approached Moore and Cregger with a script and offered them a movie project. After consideration, they accepted, rewrote the original script and adapted it to their comedy style, and after completing filming of the second season of The Whitest Kids U' Know, they directed and starred in Miss March. This was Moore's first feature film. It was released on March 13, 2009.

2010s

During their college years, Moore and Sam Brown had the idea for a movie about the American Civil War. Finally, while shooting the fifth season for The Whitest Kids U' Know, he and the troupe wrote and filmed his second feature film titled The Civil War on Drugs (2011), where they all played multiple roles. The movie was directed by Moore and Cregger. It had limited release in theaters and ultimately ran simultaneously with the fifth season of WKUK. It is a historical drama that the WKUK made to document the journey to legalize marijuana during the Civil War.

Moore played Josh Armstrong on Fox's comedy television series Breaking In.

Moore was periodically featured on The Tonight Show with Jay Leno in recurring segments showcasing pre-taped, man-on-the-street style comedy bits, featuring pranks on and encounters with an unsuspecting public. Moore also collaborated on various occasions with Funny or Die and Comedy Central.

Since the foundation of the WKUK comedy troupe, Moore and the other members have constantly participated in on-stage presentations, either individually or as a group in different projects. He toured every year with the WKUK troupe, performing old and new sketches in live shows. From time to time, Moore performed in live shows called the Whatev'r Show alongside other comedians in New York City and Hollywood.

On the first Tuesday of every month from November 6, 2012—when it opened with a special show on the night of the presidential election—through February 2013, Trevor Moore did a talk show and comedy show on stage with fellow comedian Josh Fadem in L.A. The show was called The Show Where Trevor Moore Does a Talk Show Thing and Josh Fadem Does Some Other Stuff Too All in One... Plus More.

Moore released his debut album, Drunk Texts to Myself, on Comedy Central Records in March 2013. He directed and starred in complementary musical videos for the album, also produced by Comedy Central. The album has 12 tracks, including "Drunk Texts to Myself (featuring Reggie Watts)", "What About Mouthwash?", and "Founding Fathers Rap". Drunk Texts to Myself represented contradiction in society using a variety of musical forms, going from rap and metal to country and pop. He performed the album along with some friends on a tour around the U.S.

Moore released his second album, High in Church, on Comedy Central on March 10, 2015. This album contained live and new songs. Unique songs included "Kitty History", a parable of conspiracy theories, "The Gays Got Married", a sardonic country song, and "The Ballad of Billy John", which explores the nature of malicious YouTube comments. He released his third album, The Story of Our Times, on Comedy Central on April 20, 2018. Unlike the previous album, there are no live renditions of previously released songs. The subject matter is varied, including the inanity of YouTube celebrities, reality television and Internet trolls.

Moore made a miniseries with Brown called The Trevor Moore Show that consisted of three episodes and started airing on Comedy Central in August 2019. Moore was also the creator of the Disney Channel show Just Roll With It, which premiered in June 2019.

2020s
During the COVID-19 pandemic, Moore hosted The Trevor Moore Quarantine Show on YouTube, which often involved a sketch with him and his dog, followed by a recorded live stream session with old WKUK cast members discussing random topics. He and the other members of The Whitest Kids U' Know created an animated film, Mars, which was in post-production at the time of his death in 2021.

Personal life
Moore married Aimee Carlson in October 2010. The couple first met when Moore was 23; they had one son together.

Death 
On August 7, 2021, at the age of 41, Moore died after being involved in an accident at his residence resulting in blunt force head trauma. TMZ reported that Moore fell from his upstairs balcony at his home and suffered fatal head trauma around 2:30 AM on August 7. Alcohol was later revealed to be a factor, and no other drugs were in his system at the time, according to toxicology reports. Approximately one month prior to the accident, Moore had posted on Twitter that, upon his death, he wished to be referred to as "local sexpot", which was referenced in his Vulture obituary.

Filmography

Film

Television

On stage
 Whitest Kids U' Know Live (2006–2013)
 Whatev'r Show (2011–2012)
 The Show Where Trevor Moore Does a Talk Show Thing… (2012–2013)

Discography

References

External links
 Official website
 
 
 Twitter account

1980 births
2021 deaths
Accidental deaths from falls
Accidental deaths in California
American male comedians
American comedy musicians
American male film actors
American male screenwriters
American male television actors
American television directors
American television writers
People from Montclair, New Jersey
Writers from Charlottesville, Virginia
American male television writers
21st-century American comedians
21st-century American male actors
Film directors from Virginia
Screenwriters from Virginia
American cartoonists
21st-century American screenwriters
21st-century American male writers
Burials at Hollywood Forever Cemetery